A master franchise is a franchise relationship in which the owner of the franchise brand (the master franchisor) grants to another party the right to recruit new franchisees in a specific area. In exchange, the other party typically pays some price as well as agreeing to take on some or all of the responsibility to train and support new franchisees in their area. Because the role of a master franchisee within their territory is similar to that of a franchisor, they are often referred to as sub-franchisors. As of 2020, according to an in-depth survey of franchisors based in the United States, approximately 20% of franchisors use master franchising as an international growth strategy. According to the research, it is the most popular (either by itself or in conjunction with multi-unit development), method for U.S. franchisors to expand abroad.

Business model
In general, a franchise enables a product to be dispersed across more outlets and regions, solving many geographic concerns raised by large market companies. It allows the franchisor to distribute its product or services with similar economies of scale to that of a large chain. The franchisor gives up the meticulous management of non-franchisor entities, but is still able to contain significant control over the look, feel, and branding of  geographically dispersed individual businesses. 

Generally, a master franchisor will grant the master franchisee, or subfranchisor, the right to third-party operations within a defined territory. And then, with respect to regional issues, the subfranchisor will assume the role of the franchisor, but they typically will not own or operate the franchise. They are removed from a direct management position. This duplication of the franchisor's role forms an additional layer of control in the general franchise system, which results in some small-scale inefficiencies on the small, local scale but greatly reduces the large-scale inefficiencies. Additionally, a master franchise allows the company holding the franchising permit to benefit from management talent and more and more accessible capital. 

Combined, these two factors translate into almost instant penetration into the market and a competitive advantage, both of which increase system growth rates. Managerial levels and hierarchical framework exemplify one competitive advantage. By allowing the franchisor to specialize in recruiting, screening and training of subfranchisors, who then develop their area in a similar way, the overall growth rate of chains increases. Other benefits include faster development, a more comprehensive financial base, specific expansion plans, access to capital and a regular cash flow, proximity to the customer, some independence, and the ability to address the demands of the customers as well as address the local competition.

Drawbacks
Although master franchising can be beneficial and advantageous, there are also setbacks, including legal problems and overly long contracts.  One specific setback of master franchises is the increase in agency costs. Franchise agreements are needed to codify the enforcement of behavior. But, because all aspects of the franchise cannot be predicted, this requirement raises the opportunity for franchise shirking while reducing the overall ability to monitor all aspects of the franchise. Thus, some scholars hypothesize that "new franchise systems which employ master franchising are more likely to fail than are other new franchise systems."

Examples
Generally, the types of business that would adopt a master franchise model are domestic cleaners, fast food restaurants, computer equipment, real estate agencies, and convenience food stores.

References 

Franchising